KAAN (870 kHz) is a commercial radio station located in Bethany, Missouri, and serving northwest Missouri and southern Iowa. The station broadcasts a sports radio format. KAAN is owned by Alpha Media and has a daytime-only license.  WWL in New Orleans is the 50,000-watt Class A clear-channel station on 870 AM, so KAAN must sign off at sunset to avoid interfering with WWL.  KAAN can also be heard on an FM translator station K279AP at 103.7 MHz. The translator operates 24 hours a day, even when the AM station is off the air at night.

The transmitter tower is located six miles west of Bethany on U.S. Route 136 at West 140th Avenue.

KAAN is a network affiliate of ESPN Radio with some programming from CBS Sports Radio.  It also carries NFL games from the Kansas City Chiefs and MLB games from the St. Louis Cardinals.  It first signed on the air on December 3, 1983.

Ownership
On March 1, 2007, it was announced that GoodRadio.TV LLC planned to buy The Shepherd Group of radio stations in Missouri.  The Shepherd Group operated 16 small-market radio stations in Missouri.  The deal was reportedly worth $30.6 million.

Dean Goodman formed the new company, GoodRadio.TV.  He is the former president and chief executive officer of the television broadcasting company ION Media Networks Inc. Goodman stepped down from ION Media Networks in October 2006.

The Shepherd Group included KJEL-FM and KBNN in Lebanon; KJFF in Festus; KREI and KTJJ in Farmington; KRES and KWIX in Moberly; KIRK in Macon; KIIK, KOZQ-FM, KJPW and KFBD-FM in Waynesville; KAAN-FM and KAAN in Bethany; and KMRN and KKWK in Cameron.

In December 2013, GoodRadio.TV merged into Digity, LLC. Effective February 25, 2016, Digity and its 124 radio stations were acquired by Alpha Media for $264 million.

References

External links

AAN
Sports radio stations in the United States
Radio stations established in 2007
AAN (AM)
Alpha Media radio stations